Ralph W. Kuncl is an American neurologist and president emeritus of the University of Redlands.

His previous administrative positions include as provost/executive vice president at the University of Rochester and provost at Bryn Mawr College. The majority of his early career was spent at the Johns Hopkins School of Medicine, where he served as professor of neurology, pathology, and cellular and molecular medicine and became known for his research on the disease mechanisms of muscle disorders and amyotrophic lateral sclerosis (ALS).

Kuncl is a graduate of Occidental College (magna cum laude, Phi Beta Kappa) and earned a Ph.D. and M.D. from the University of Chicago.

References

External links
 

Heads of universities and colleges in the United States
Living people
American neurologists
Year of birth missing (living people)
Occidental College alumni
Pritzker School of Medicine alumni
Johns Hopkins University faculty
University of Rochester people
Bryn Mawr College